The Copa Polla Gol 1983 was the 13th edition of the Chilean Cup tournament. The competition started on March 6, 1983 and concluded on July 10, 1983. Only first level teams took part in the tournament. Universidad Católica won the competition for their first time, winning the final liguilla. In this edition, and for the first time, the Chilean Cup qualified teams to Copa Libertadores; in this case, the champions Universidad Católica and the runners-up O'Higgins.

Calendar

Group Round

North Group

Magallanes qualified for the second round due to its better group head-to-head results (3-1 & 2-2)

South Group

Second round

Group A

Group B

Final Liguilla

First matchday

Second matchday

Third matchday

Top goalscorer
 Jorge Aravena (Universidad Católica) 23 goals

See also
 1983 Campeonato Nacional
 1983 Copa República

Sources

RSSSF

Chile
1983
1983 in Chilean football